Aeromachus is a genus of grass skippers in the family Hesperiidae. The species are known by the common name of scrub hoppers. They are found in the eastern Palearctic and the Indomalayan realm.

Club of antenna of medium thickness, with a short, recurved tip. The second segment of the palpus erect, the third porrect (stretched forward). Vein 5 of forewing midway between 4 and 6. The males have usually a linear stigma on the forewing which extends from vein 3 to 1.

Species
Aeromachus bandaishanus Murayama & Shimonoya, 1973
Aeromachus catocyanea (Mabille, 1879) Yunnan
Aeromachus cognatus Inoue & Kawazoe, 1966 Vietnam
Aeromachus dubius Elwes & Edwards, 1897
Aeromachus inachus (Ménétriés, 1859) Ussuri, Amurland, Taiwan, Japan.
Aeromachus jhora (de Nicéville, 1885)
Aeromachus kali (de Nicéville, 1885)
Aeromachus matsudai Murayama, 1943
Aeromachus monstrabilus Huang, 2003 Tibet
Aeromachus muscus (Mabille, 1876)
Aeromachus piceus Leech, 1894 Sichuan, Yunnan
Aeromachus plumbeola (C. & R. Felder, 1867)
Aeromachus propinquus Alphéraky, 1897 Yunnan
Aeromachus pseudojhora Lee, 1962 South Yunnan
Aeromachus pygmaeus (Fabricius, 1775) Nilgiris, Wynaad, Coorg, Kanara, Assam to Burma, Thailand
Aeromachus skola Evans, 1943
Aeromachus spuria Evans, 1943
Aeromachus stigmata (Moore, 1878) Northwest Himalaya, Murree to Assam, Burma, Thailand, Laos, Yunnan.

References
Natural History Museum Lepidoptera genus database
Aeromachus at funet

External links

Images representing Aeromachus at Consortium for the Barcode of Life

 
Butterflies of Indochina
Hesperiidae genera